The Alta Mesa Farm Bureau Hall in Wilton, California was listed on the National Register of Historic Places in 1987. 

It was a one-story wood-frame building.  It was built in 1913 and expanded by addition of a kitchen wing into an L-shape in 1930.

The hall was destroyed by fire in 1987, although the detached restroom building still stood as of June 2014.

See also
National Register of Historic Places listings in Sacramento County, California
California Historical Landmarks in Sacramento County, California

References

External links

Buildings and structures in Sacramento County, California
National Register of Historic Places in Sacramento County, California
Clubhouses on the National Register of Historic Places in California